The 2017–18 season was Red Star's 12th in the Serbian SuperLiga and 72nd consecutive season in the top flight of Yugoslav and Serbian football. The club participated in the Serbian SuperLiga, the Serbian Cup and the UEFA Europa League. 

It was the first time they have played in the UEFA Europa League group stage since its rebranding, having previously participated in the 2007–08 UEFA Cup. The season covered the period from 29 June 2017 to 19 May 2018.

Competitions

Overview

Serbian SuperLiga

Regular season

Results summary

Round by round

Matches

Championship round

Results summary

Round by round

Matches

Serbian Cup

First round

Second round

Quarter finals

UEFA Europa League

First qualifying round

Second qualifying round

Third qualifying round

Play-off round

Group stage

Round of 32

Squad

Squad statistics

Goalscorers
Includes all competitive matches. The list is sorted by shirt number when total goals are equal.

Clean sheets
Includes all competitive matches. The list is sorted by shirt number when total clean sheets are equal.

Transfers

In

Out

Loan return and promoted

Loan out

See also 
 2017–18 KK Crvena zvezda season

References

Red Star Belgrade seasons
Red Star
Red Star
Serbian football championship-winning seasons